Cottsia is a genus in the Malpighiaceae, a family of about 75 genera of flowering plants in the order Malpighiales. Cottsia comprises 3 species of slender twining vines native to northern Mexico and extending into Texas, New Mexico, and Arizona. The species of Cottsia were formerly included in Janusia, a genus of South America.

External link and reference
 Malpighiaceae Malpighiaceae - description, taxonomy, phylogeny, and nomenclature
 Cottsia
 Anderson, W. R., and C. Davis, 2007. Generic adjustments in Neotropical Malpighiaceae. Contributions from the University of Michigan Herbarium 25: 137–166.

Malpighiaceae
Malpighiaceae genera